On Sunday June 5, 2022, some parts of Accra was flooded during a downpour. The rain which lasted for about four hours left its mark on areas like Kaneshie, the worst hit after the downpour.

Some of the areas which were heavily affected are Kwame Nkrumah Circle, Spintex Road, Tetteh Quarshe, Fiesta Royal and Nsawam Road.

Due to the flooding situation in Accra, President Akufo-Addo directed the city authorities and District Assemblies (MMDAs) in the Greater Accra Region to demolish all structures on the river way causing flooding in the city.

See Also 
2015 Accra floods
2016 Accra floods

References

2022 in Ghana 
Floods in Ghana 
2022 disasters in Ghana 
2022 floods in Africa